Guiye Frayo is a London-based Argentine indie duo consisting of members Guillermo Martinez Ipucha and Veronica Santillo.

Their music has elements of different styles combining pop, rock, psychedelic, electronica, dance and experimental to create a unique sound.

They not only play conventional instruments (guitars, keyboards and drums) but also theremin, circuit-bent toys and vintage synthesizers among others.

So far, they have released two Albums, nine EPs, nine Singles, and two video-clips.  They are currently working in new material.

In 2006 they won the Argentine bands/soloists contest "Vale por un video Clip" for the song "Arcoiris en un ojo", organized by FM La Tribu, Buenos Aires, Argentina.  The judge were Tom Lupo (Argentine radio host, poet and psychologist), Guillermo Pintos  (Rolling Stone Argentina magazine at the time) and MTV Latin America VJ and Ruth Infarinato, the prize was the filming of a video-clip to the winning song. The video clip was made by Cine Humus, and won Best Video clip at "Festival de Audiovisuales de La Plata"

English actress Emma Kennedy once suggested "Autumn Freaks" as song of the day in her blog.

They performed a live session at Balcony TV- London in August 2009 where they played an unusual toy based set up.

In 2010 "Portrait", "The Walk" and "Funky Monkey" were broadcast on Japan radio Takaoka

The band was introduced by Tom Robinson on BBC Radio 6 (BBC Introducing) several times, for the first time in 2008 with the song "Vida Minima", then in 2010 with "The Walk", again in 2011 Tom Robinson officially presented "A Magnetic Field Called Love" single release, the video clip to the song was launched the same week. Finally in 2014 their song "You and Me" was played on (BBC Introducing).

In 2015 the song "The Way I Like You" from their EP TWILY was featured in the popular video editing app Magisto.

History 
Guiye Frayo was originally a solo project by Guillermo. He had met Veronica in a previous band in which they played together, Guillermo decided to turn his soloist project into a band in 2007. After relocating to London they met Jordan who joined them on drums during 2010, when they recorded "A Magnetic Field called love"

Discography

Albums 
Happily Made - 26 April 2019
Endless Fun - 1 February 2019

EPs 
7 - 15 June 2015
Electrified Brains - 29 September 2014
Picnic in the Clouds - 28 July 2014
Wordless - 23 September 2013
Twily -  8 April 2013
Psychedelic outer space dance - 22 March 2010
London Ghosts Instrumental versions - 30 November 2009
Computer in the shower (aka La Computadora en la Ducha) -  20 July 2009
London Ghosts - 24 March 2009

Singles 
Electric Boundaries - 25 February 2014
You and Me - 17 February 2014
Canyon Winds - 19 August 2013
Toxic Fields - 12 August 2013
It's Good to Know -  5 August 2013
A Bridge to Your Heart -  21 June 2013
Funky Monkey Lunar - 18 November 2011
Hey Honey Money! - 11 November 2011
A Magnetic Field Called Love -  7 February 2011

Awards

Collaborations 
 2007: Guillermo joined Greek band "The Fifth Galaxy Orchestra" crew  and participated in the recording of their album "Music Through The Years" released in 2008 by Sunset Rouge Music playing Theremin in the song "2000 Feet Over Paris".
 2007: Guillermo was invited to play Theremin at the launch of "Tropico" Spring Summer 08 Collection by Martin Churba (one of Argentina's most talented and well-known designers) with DJ Vivi Pedraglio.
 2005 :  Guillermo was invited by Hilda Lizarazu (rock-pop Argentine singer-songwriter) to play Theremin in 2 of a series of 4 shows called “Elegante Sport “ at Club del Vino in Buenos Aires, Argentina.
 2005 :  Guillermo was invited by Eterno Ahora (rock-pop Argentine band) to play Theremin in the presentation of Anima at the Teatro Municipal de Bahía Blanca,       Argentina.

References

External links 
 

Argentine emigrants to England
Musical groups from London
English indie rock groups